Juan Francisco Casas (born September 21, 1976 in La Carolina, Jaén, Andalusia) is a Spanish artist and poet. Casas recreates photographs he's taken as large scale oil paintings on canvas, as well as similarly scaled drawings using only blue ballpoint pens. The drawings and paintings are created in photo realistic style most of them as large as 10 feet.

Education 

Juan Francisco Casas Ruiz graduated with a B.A. and a M.F.A. from the University of Granada. He subsequently completed his PhD at the university in 2004, while also holding a teaching position there. During his studies he won the National Award of the Ministry of Education and Science for the best graduate qualifications in Spain, presented by Culture Minister Pilar del Castillo.

Professional career 

Since 2000, he has exhibited his work at museums all around the world, like the Museum Kunsthalle der Hypo-Kulturstiftung in Munich, Kunsthalle Emden (Germany), the Kunsthal Rotterdam (Netherlands), the Cube Museum  Seongnam Arts Center, Seongnam, (South Korea), the Da2 Museum in Salamanca and the ARTIUM in Vitoria (Spain). He represented Spain at the 2nd Prague Biennale (curated by Flash Art Magazine and Giancarlo Politi) and has received numerous international awards: Prize of the Royal Academy of Spain in Rome, the ABC Painting Prize.  and the Scholarship of the College of Spain in Paris. He has published poetry books and curated exhibitions with artists such as Joseph Kosuth and Nobuyoshi Araki. His work can be found in the Artium Museum, Vitoria, Museo ABC, Madrid, Collection of the Ministry of Foreign Affairs of Spain, Collection of the Royal Academy of Spain in Rome, Absolut Collection, etc.

References

External links
Villa, Manuela (2007). Emerging Art in Spain. Madrid: Vaivén. 
Juan Francisco Casas in Artfacts
 Juan Francisco Casas' web site
 Juan Francisco Casas in Artnet
Juan Francisco Casas, all articles in Juxtapoz
Juan Francisco Casas, interview at ABC
Juan Francisco Casas, last article in Juxtapoz
Juan Francisco Casas, interview at Elemmental

1976 births
Living people
Spanish artists
20th-century Spanish painters
20th-century Spanish male artists
Spanish male painters
21st-century Spanish painters
University of Granada alumni
Ballpoint pen art
21st-century Spanish male artists